Pinkerman is an unincorporated community in Scioto County, in the U.S. state of Ohio.

History
A post office called Pinkerman was established in 1884, and remained in operation until 1904. Besides the post office, Pinkerman had a United Brethren church.

References

Unincorporated communities in Scioto County, Ohio
Unincorporated communities in Ohio